Paramakudi is a state assembly constituency in Ramanathapuram district in Tamil Nadu. It is a Scheduled Caste reserved constituency. It is a component of Ramanathapuram Lok sabha constituency. It is one of the 234 State Legislative Assembly Constituencies in Tamil Nadu, in India.

Elections and winners in the constituency are listed below.

Madras State

Tamil Nadu

Election Results

2021

2019 By-election

2016

2011

2006

2001

1996

1991

1989

1984

1980

1977

1971

1967

1962

1957

1952

Party leaders 
இரா. ஜீவரத்தினம்
Paramakudi North Town Secretary

References

Ramanathapuram district
Assembly constituencies of Tamil Nadu